
Year 259 BC was a year of the pre-Julian Roman calendar. At the time it was known as the Year of the Consulship of Scipio and Florus (or, less frequently, year 495 Ab urbe condita). The denomination 259 BC for this year has been used since the early medieval period, when the Anno Domini calendar era became the prevalent method in Europe for naming years.

Events 
 By place 

 Seleucid Empire 
 The Seleucid king Antiochus II starts the Second Syrian War against Ptolemy II Philadelphus to avenge his father's losses.  Antiochus II finds a willing ally in Antigonus II Gonatas, the king of Macedonia, who has been dealing with Ptolemy II's attempts to destabilize Macedonia.

 Sicily 
 The Carthaginians under Hamilcar take advantage of their victory at Thermae in Sicily by counterattacking the Romans and seizing Enna. Hamilcar continues south to Camarina, in Syracusan territory, to try to convince the Syracusans to rejoin the Carthaginian side.

China
 The State of Zhou cedes to the State of Qin the Han region of Yuanyong and six cities of Zhao in exchange for peace.

Births 
 February 18 – Qin Shi Huang, first emperor of China (d. 210 BC)
 Bashu Guafu Qing, Chinese businesswoman (d. 210 BC)

Deaths

References